Rampage is a 2006 documentary by Australian war artist, George Gittoes. It is a sequel to his previous documentary, Soundtrack to War. The film follows the lives of three brothers living in Miami's notorious brown sub ghettos.

Hip hop performers Swizz Beatz, Fat Joe and DJ Kaleb appear in the film.

Background
Elliot Lovett, whom Gittoes befriended during the filming of Soundtrack to War, told him of his family and his younger brother Marcus, who he insisted was a gifted poet-rapper. Gittoes made the trip to Miami to meet the family, with the intention of creating a Stateside sequel to Soundtrack to War, continuing the theme of music in a dangerous place.

References

External links
 

Documentary films about hip hop music and musicians
Australian documentary films
Films set in Miami
2006 films
2006 documentary films
Documentary films about African-American gangs
2000s English-language films